William Alexander Noblett, CBE (born 16 April 1953) is a retired Anglican priest and author: he was Chaplain-General of Prisons from 2001  to 2011.
 
He was educated at The High School, Dublin, Southampton University,  and Salisbury & Wells Theological College, with a B.Th. from Southampton in 1978, graduating with an M.Th. in Applied Theology at Oxford University in 1998. He was ordained  deacon in 1978 and priest in 1979. After a curacy in Sholing he was Rector of Ardamine Union from  1980 to 1982. He was a Chaplain in the RAF from  1982 to 1984; and Vicar of St Thomas, Middlesbrough from 1984 to 1987. He was a prison chaplain at Wakefield, Norwich and Full Sutton prisons 1987-2001, before becoming Chaplain General and Archdeacon of Prisons.  He was a Canon and Prebend of York Minster from 2001 to 2012, and is a Canon Emeritus; an Honorary Canon of Liverpool Cathedral from 2009 to 2012; and has been a Chaplain to HM the Queen from 2005-2022. He was appointed a Chaplain to The King in 2022. He received the 2013 Perrie Award for his 'outstanding contribution to the criminal justice system'. In 2009 he was made an Honorary Life Member of the American Correctional Chaplains Association for his leadership.  At the conclusion of the Venerable Noblett's term of office, which saw him criticised for a perceived condescending attitude towards traditional religious belief, the Church of England faced the possible loss of the Chaplain General's position.

References

1953 births
Christian clergy from Dublin (city)
People educated at The High School, Dublin
Alumni of the University of Southampton
Alumni of Wells Theological College
Royal Air Force chaplains
Chaplains-General of Prisons
Honorary Chaplains to the Queen
Commanders of the Order of the British Empire
Living people